Symacho (fl. early 1st century CE) was the daughter of King Abinergaos I of Characene. She was converted to Judaism by Ananias of Adiabene. Symacho married Izates bar Monobaz during the latter's sojourn in Charax as a youth. She presumably went with him when he left to take up his throne in Adiabene.

Iraqi Jews
Judaism in Adiabene
Jewish royalty
Converts to Judaism from paganism
1st-century women
Princesses
Ancient Jewish women
1st-century Jews